Former Los Angeles County Metropolitan Transportation Authority Metro Express routes in Los Angeles County, California.

400-405: via Pasadena Freeway

401 - Downtown L.A. - Pasadena - Altadena via Allen Avenue Express

Line 401 provided service from Downtown Los Angeles to Pasadena via the Pasadena Freeway. Line 401 ran along Arroyo Parkway, Colorado Boulevard, and Allen Avenue. Line 401 was cancelled as a result of the opening of the Metro Gold Line and was replaced by Line 686, with the southern terminus at the Fillmore Station.

402 - Downtown L.A. - Pasadena Park-n-Ride Express

Line 402 was a rush hour-only express line terminating at a park-n-ride facility in Old Town Pasadena near Colorado Boulevard and Fair Oaks Avenue. It was cancelled in June 2001.

406-409: via Glendale Freeway

406 - Downtown L.A. - Sunland via Pennsylvania Avenue Express

Line 406 was a rush hour-only express for Line 90, traveling on the Golden State Freeway (Interstate 5) and Glendale Freeway (SR 2) before exiting SR 2 at Verdugo Boulevard in La Cañada Flintridge and joining Line 90 for the remainder of the route to Sunland. It was replaced by LADOT Commuter Express 409 in June 1995.

407 - Downtown L.A. - Sunland via La Crescenta Avenue Express

Line 407 was a rush hour-only express for Line 91, traveling on the Golden State Freeway (Interstate 5) and Glendale Freeway (SR 2) before exiting SR 2 at Verdugo Boulevard in La Cañada Flintridge and joining Line 91 for the remainder of the route to Sunland. It was replaced by LADOT Commuter Express 409 in June 1995.

410-419: via Golden State Freeway

410 - Downtown L.A. Glenoaks Boulevard - Brand Boulevard Express
Line 410 was a rush hour-only express for Line 92, traveling on the Golden State Freeway (Interstate 5) before exiting at Colorado Boulevard in Glendale and joining Line 92 for the remainder of the route to San Fernando. It was cancelled in June 2003.

412 - Downtown L.A. - North Hollywood Express
Line 412 was a rush hour-only express for Line 96 when Line 96 traveled to Valley Plaza in North Hollywood. Line 412 traveled on the Golden State Freeway (Interstate 5) and the Ventura Freeway (SR 134) before exiting at Buena Vista Street in Burbank and joining Line 96 for the remainder of the route to North Hollywood. It was cancelled in June 1995.

413 - Downtown L.A. - Burbank - North Hollywood - Van Nuys Express
Line 413 was transferred to LADOT Commuter Express. It was cancelled in July 2010.

418 - Downtown L.A. - Canoga Park - Van Nuys - Sun Valley Express
Line 418 was renumbered 353 in June 2005 (later cancelled in December 2020). The express service was cancelled in June 2003 when the line was realigned to terminate at North Hollywood Station, with the Metro Red Line replacing the express service.

419 - Downtown L.A. - Mission Hills - Granada Hills - Chatsworth Express
Line 419 was transferred to LADOT Commuter Express.

420–429: via Hollywood Freeway

420 – Downtown L.A. - Panorama City – Van Nuys – North Hollywood – Hollywood Express
Line 420 was renumbered 156 in June 2000 and later to 237 in June 2016. The express service to Downtown LA was cancelled in June 1999 when the line was extended to terminate at Vermont/Santa Monica Station, with the Metro Red Line replacing the express service.  From 1983 to 1986, the line extended all the way to Northridge Fashion Center, but this service was replaced with Line 167.

421 – Downtown L.A. – Panorama City Express via Universal City Express
Line 421 operated from 1983 to 1986, when it was replaced with Line 167.

422 – Thousand Oaks – Warner Center – Downtown L.A. Express
Line 422, while technically a Metro line, has been operated by LADOT as an LADOT Commuter Express since its creation in February 1998. It is unusual in that it is a reverse commute route. It was a renaming of the former 427A route. 
An unrelated Line 422 operated between Los Angeles and Arleta from 1983 to 1986.

423 – Downtown L.A. – Encino – Thousand Oaks Express
Line 423 has been operated by LADOT as Commuter Express since 1986. It operated as a Metro line from 1983 to 1986.

424 – Downtown L.A. - Canoga Park – Warner Center – Ventura Boulevard Local Express
Line 424 was renumbered to 150 in June 2000 and realigned to terminate at Universal City Station, with the Metro Red Line replacing the express service.

425 – Downtown L.A. - Ventura Boulevard Limited Express
Line 425 provided express service to Downtown L.A. via Ventura Boulevard; on Ventura Boulevard the service only made limited stops. Replaced by Metro Rapid Line 750, with the Metro Red Line replacing the express service.

426 – Downtown L.A. - San Fernando Valley – Sherman Way – Wilshire Boulevard Express
Line 426 was renumbered to 363 in June 2005 and later to 162 in June 2012. The express service was cancelled in June 2003 (it had been realigned to serve North Hollywood Station in June 2000 and all service was cut back to there three years later, with the Metro Red Line replacing the express service).

427 – Downtown L.A. – Warner Center – Canoga Park Express
Line 427 was replaced by Metro Rapid Line 750, with the Metro Red Line replacing the express service.

427A – Hollywood – Warner Center - Downtown L.A. Express
Line 427A was a reverse commute route slightly differed from 427 that operated during morning rush hours outbound from Downtown Los Angeles, through Hollywood, to Warner Center, and during afternoon rush hours in reverse. In 1998, it was renumbered as 422, with the route extended to Thousand Oaks, and operations  transferred to  LADOT as a Commuter Express service.

429 – Downtown L.A. – Sunset Boulevard Express
Line 429 was a rush hour-only express for Line 2, traveling on the Hollywood Freeway (US 101) before exiting at Sunset Boulevard in Hollywood and joining Line 2 for the remainder of the route to Westwood, terminating at the corner of Westwood Boulevard and Wilshire Boulevard. It was canceled in June 2000, with the Metro Red Line replacing the express service.

430-439: via Santa Monica Freeway

430 - Downtown L.A. - Sunset Blvd. - Pacific Palisades Express
Line 430 was transferred to LADOT Commuter Express. The service was cancelled in July 2010 due to low ridership. Line 430 replaced between Westwood and Pacific Palisades with Lines 2 and 302, until they were shortened to Westwood in 2018. The portion between Westwood and Pacific Palisades is now Metro Shuttle Line 602.

431 - Downtown L.A. - Westwood Express
Line 431 was transferred to LADOT Commuter Express.

434 - Union Station - Patsaouras Transit Plaza - Downtown L.A. - Santa Monica - Malibu Express
Line 434 was a full-service line along Pacific Coast Highway between Santa Monica and Malibu with weekday and rush-hour trips to West Los Angeles Transit Center (near the Fairfax Avenue exit of Interstate 10) and Downtown Los Angeles via Interstate 10, respectively. The freeway service from Downtown Los Angeles was changed to a limited-stop service line along Venice Boulevard and renumbered Line 534, and that portion of the route was subsequently cancelled in December 2005. The routing was shortened to between West Los Angeles Transit Center and Malibu. When Phase 2 of the Expo Line opened to Santa Monica, the route was shortened further to terminate at the Expo Line at the Downtown Santa Monica station. Over 6 years, LIne 534 was renumbered to Local Line 134 to match with 100-series routes as it now runs more like a local route.

436 - Downtown L.A. - Venice Boulevard - Ocean Park Express
Line 436 was a rush hour-only express for Line 33, traveling on the Santa Monica Freeway (Interstate 10) before exiting at Venice Boulevard in Palms and joining Line 33 for the remainder of the route to Venice. It was cancelled in June 2001.

437 - Downtown L.A. - Marina Del Rey Express
Line 437 had an express portion between Downtown LA and Culver City where then it turned into a limited stop service down Culver Blvd following former Line 220 to Marina Del Rey. Line 437 was transferred to LADOT Commuter Express.

438 - Downtown L.A. - Culver City - Manhattan Beach Express
Line 438 was transferred to LADOT Commuter Express.

439 - Downtown L.A. - Fox Hills - LAX - Redondo Beach Express
Line 439 was cancelled in June 2012 upon the opening of the E (Expo) Line.  It was first terminated in Redondo Beach (replaced by Beach Cities Transit Line 109), later to Aviation Station (replaced by Culver City Transit Line 6 and Santa Monica Big Blue Bus Line 3), then finally at Fox Hills Mall (replaced by Metro Local Line 217 while the E (Expo) Line took over the express portion). In late 2019, line 439 was transferred to LADOT Commuter Express that only took part in Downtown Los Angeles to LAX/El Segundo C (Green) Line Station.

440-450: via Harbor Transitway

442 - Downtown L.A. - Manchester Avenue - La Brea Avenue - Hawthorne/Lennox Station - South Bay Galleria Express
Line 442 provided service between Downtown LA to Hawthorne/Lennox C (Green) Line Station (formerly to South Bay Galleria). It was an express counterpart of Line 40. It ran on Figueroa/Flower Streets through Harbor Transitway/Freeway before exiting Manchester Avenue and traveled on that street and onto La Brea Avenue and Hawthorne Boulevard. Line 442 was cancelled on December 13, 2020 due to low ridership. This line has not been operated since April 2020 due to COVID-19. Riders may use the C Line (Green) rail or bus Lines 40 and 115 to connect with the J Line (Silver) service to/from downtown LA. This was the last line to have the numbers 44 in the beginning.

443 - Downtown L.A. - North Torrance - Redondo Beach - Palos Verdes Express
Line 443 was canceled when Metro Green Line began service. This rush-hour only express line provided service to Downtown Los Angeles from South Bay along Artesia Boulevard west of Interstate 405, as well as Aviation Boulevard and Prospect Avenue in Hermosa Beach and Redondo Beach, as express service for Lines 225 and 226, with the southern terminus at Malaga Cove Plaza Shopping Center. The service has been replaced by the other Metro and Torrance Transit express lines on the Harbor Transitway.

444 - Downtown L.A. - Artesia Boulevard - Hawthorne Boulevard - Rancho Palos Verdes Express
Line 444 provided service between Downtown LA and Rancho Palos Verdes.  It ran through Figueroa and Flower Streets in Downtown Los Angeles, through the Harbor Freeway as the express portion, and through Artesia Boulevard and Hawthorne Boulevard in the South Bay.  It made limited stops between the Artesia Transit Center and Pacific Coast Highway.  It was renumbered Line 344 in December 2009, while the Metro Silver Line replaced the express service.

445 - Downtown L.A. - Alpine Village - San Pedro Express
Line 445 was canceled in June 2011 due to a budget crisis, replaced by an off-peak extension of Line 450 (between the Artesia Transit Center and San Pedro) and the Metro Silver Line (on the Harbor Transitway).

446 - Union Station - Downtown L.A. - San Pedro via Pacific Avenue Express
Line 446 provided service between Downtown Los Angeles and San Pedro.  It ran through Figueroa and Flower Streets in Downtown LA, through the Harbor Freeway as the express portion, and through Avalon Boulevard and Pacific Avenue through Carson, Wilmington and San Pedro.  It was shortened back to the Artesia Transit Center and renumbered Line 246 in December 2009, with the Metro Silver Line replacing the express service.

447 - Union Station - Downtown L.A. - San Pedro via 7th Street Express
Line 447, a partial duplication of Line 446, provided service between Downtown Los Angeles and San Pedro Peninsula Hospital.  It ran through Figueroa and Flower Streets in Downtown Los Angeles, through the Harbor Freeway as the express portion, and through Avalon Boulevard, Harbor Boulevard and 7th Street through Carson, Wilmington and San Pedro.  It was shortened back to the Artesia Transit Center and renumbered Line 247 in December 2009 (Line 247 was replaced by Lines 205 and 450 in June 2011 due to a budget crisis, the latter being merged into the Silver Line in December 2015), with the Metro Silver Line replacing the express service.

448 - Downtown L.A. - Palos Verdes Peninsula Express
Line 448 was transferred to LADOT Commuter Express.

450 - Downtown L.A. - San Pedro via Pacific Avenue and 21st Street Metro Express
This line was replaced by the extension of the Metro Silver Line in December 2015, (between the Harbor Gateway Transit Center and San Pedro) and the Metro Silver Line (on the Harbor Transitway).

451-459: via Long Beach Freeway

455 -  Downtown L.A. - Lakewood Express
Line 455 operated from Downtown Los Angeles to Bellflower and South in Lakewood, via southbound Interstate 5 and Interstate 710, then exiting the freeway and traveling via Rosecrans Avenue, Paramount Blvd, Compton Blvd, Lakewood Blvd, Alondra Blvd and Bellflower Blvd. It was only operated during weekday peak hours in peak directions: northbound during the morning hours and southbound during the afternoon hours; however, there isn't much service, as there is usually one bus line that would take patrons between Lakewood and Downtown Los Angeles. This line was not immediately canceled after the opening of the Metro Blue Line due in part that the northern terminus at 7th Street / Metro Center / Julian Dixon Station and the southern loop in Downtown Long Beach was under construction; thus, this route continued to operate until June 1991, a few months after the opening 7th Street / Julian Dixon Station.

456 -  Downtown L.A. - Downtown Long Beach Express
Line 456 had two iterations. The original route of the 456 was a 24-hour service, going nonstop on the Santa Ana Freeway [I-5] and the Long Beach [I-710] Freeway. Its northern terminus was at Temple Street & Fremont Avenue in Downtown Los Angeles, with surface streets on Flower and Figueroa Streets (going southbound and northbound respectively), & 5th and 6th Streets (westbound and eastbound respectively); while its southern terminus was at Long Beach & Ocean Boulevards, with Long Beach Boulevard as its main artery in the City of Long Beach. The 456 was soon cancelled shortly after the opening of the Metro Blue Line. 
28 years later, the 456 was revitalized as part of a pilot program due to the popular of the shuttle express predecessor (the 860), when patrons wanted a faster express route between Downtown Los Angeles and Downtown Long Beach; this time, the route was nonstop between the Express Lanes entrance of the Harbor Freeway [I-110] and the Pacific Avenue offramp from the San Diego Freeway [I-405]. It had operated in peak directions: northbound during the mornings and southbound during the afternoons. Due to the COVID-19 pandemic, the 456 was subsequentially cancelled once again.

457 - Downtown L.A. - East Long Beach - Park-n-Ride - Belmont Shore Express
Line 457 was a rush-hour only express line operating from Downtown Los Angeles (corner of Temple Street and Los Angeles Street) to the Marina Shores Shopping Center at the corner of Pacific Coast Highway and Westminster Avenue in Belmont Shore. It also served a Park-n-Ride lot at the Long Beach Airport. From Los Angeles, it traveled on southbound Interstate 5, southbound Interstate 710 and southbound Interstate 405, exiting at Lakewood Boulevard in Long Beach. It first headed north on Lakewood Boulevard for the Long Beach Airport Park-n-Ride before traveling south on Lakewood Boulevard, through the Long Beach Traffic Circle and Ximeno Avenue, and turning east on Second Street to Belmont Shore. When Metro Blue Line began service, a feeder Line 457 was put into service from the Del Amo Blue Line Station, but was cancelled shortly after.

459 - Downtown L.A. - Los Alamitos - Huntington Beach Express
Line 459 was transferred to OCTA Line 701 in November 1987.

460-469: via Santa Ana Freeway

462 - Downtown L.A. - Santa Fe Springs - Norwalk - Cerritos - Hawaiian Gardens Express
Line 462 was renumbered Line 362 in October 1998 when the express portion of the route (along Interstate 5 between Lorena Street and Eastern Avenue) was eliminated in favor of a limited-stop routing along Olympic Boulevard and Telegraph Road. In December 2005, the line was renumbered to Line 62.

464 - Downtown L.A. - Fullerton - Buena Park - Park-n-Ride Express
Line 464 was replaced by OCTA Line 721 in November 1986.

466 - Downtown L.A. - Downey - La Mirada - Park-n-Ride Express(Rosecrans/La Mirada)
Line 466 was a rush-hour only express line serving between Downtown Los Angeles (at the corner of Temple Street and Los Angeles Street) and La Mirada Park-n-Ride (near Adelfa Drive and Santa Gertrudes Avenue), traveling on Santa Ana Freeway.  It had an off-freeway bus stop at the Lakewood Boulevard exit of Interstate 5 in Downey. Line 466 was cancelled in June 2001. Alternatives include Lines 104 (later transferred to Montebello Bus Line 50), 125 (A segment east of Norwalk Station was transferred to Norwalk Transit Line 5), and Line 460.

470-479: via Pomona Freeway

470 - Downtown L.A. - Whittier - La Habra - Brea Mall Express
Lines 470 and 471 service from Downtown Los Angeles were cancelled in October 1998.  Line 470 was replaced with Line 318 limited (Wilshire/Western-Downtown LA-Whittier-Brea Mall via 6th Street/Whittier Boulevard), later by Metro Rapid line 720. Line 471 was transformed into a local line between Puente Hills Mall and Brea Mall. Line 471 was eventually handed over to Foothill Transit and now operates as Route 285. The route along Whittier Boulevard (between Atlantic Blvd and Whittwood Mall) is now operated by Montebello Transit Line 10. Service between Whittier Boulevard/Colima Road and Beach Boulevard/La Habra Boulevard is provided by Foothill Transit line 285. Service between Beach Boulevard/La Habra Boulevard and Brea Mall is provided by OCTA Route 129.

471 - Downtown L.A. - Whittier - Puente Hills Mall Express
Line 471 service from Downtown Los Angeles was cancelled in October 1998. A new Line 471 was formed between 1998 and 2004 by attaching the former Line 470 routing along Whittier Boulevard east of Colima Road to the segment of Line 471 routing along Colima Road to Puente Hills Mall, which made the new Line 471 a local line between Puente Hills Mall and Brea Mall. The new Line 471 was canceled in February 2004 when it was replaced by Foothill Transit Line 285 and OCTA Route 129.

480-489: via El Monte Busway

480 - Downtown L.A. - El Monte - West Covina - Pomona Express
Line 480 was transferred to Foothill Transit. The route to Downtown Los Angeles was replaced by lines 484 and 490 (later, the route to Downtown Los Angeles was replaced by the Silver Streak and 484 and 490 were renumbered to Foothill Transit 190 and 194)

481 - Wilshire District - Downtown L.A. - El Monte - West Covina Express
Line 481 was transferred to Foothill Transit. The route was then cancelled in October 2017, services now provide Metro Local line 20, Metro Express lines 487, 489, Metro Rapid Line 720 and the Silver Streak.

482 - Downtown L.A. - El Monte - Hacienda Heights - Pomona Express
Line 482 was transferred to Foothill Transit But now only has services in Pomona (Pomona Transit Center) to Puente Hills Mall, the express service form El Monte and Downtown Los Angeles around Freeway 60 and Santa Anita Avenue was replaced by Foothill Transit line 269 (but continues from Santa Anita Avenue and not the Freeway 60). The Express service from Downtown Los Angeles was replaced by line 484 & 490 (later the Metro Silver Line) while the route from El Monte to Puente Hills Mall was replaced by Foothill Transit line 282.

483 - Downtown L.A. - Altadena via Fair Oaks Avenue Express
Line 483 provided service from Downtown Los Angeles to Altadena, mainly on Fair Oaks Avenue. It followed the same route as Line 485 from Downtown Los Angeles to Fremont Avenue and Huntington Drive in South Pasadena. Line 483 was canceled in June 2003 with the advent of the Metro Gold Line, and the Fair Oaks Avenue portion was replaced by restructured Lines 260 and 361 (Line 361 replaced by Metro Rapid 762 in June 2008).

484 - Downtown L.A. - El Monte - Pomona - Ontario Airport Express
Line 484 traveled from Downtown Los Angeles to as far as the old Ontario Airport terminal off Vineyard Avenue in Ontario. It was subsequently shorted to Pomona Transit Center, and further shorted to Cal Poly Pomona. Line 484 then was renumbered to Line 194 in December 2009 before the line was transferred to the Foothill Transit in late June 2016, with the Metro Silver Line replacing the express service.

485 - Downtown L.A. - Altadena via Lake Avenue Express
Line 485 ran from Downtown Los Angeles to Altadena through Fremont Avenue and Lake Avenue.  Most of the line was merged into Line 258 in June 2016 with the exception of the El Monte Busway segment to Patsaouras Transit Plaza. Replacement of the Downtown LA segment is provided by Lines 487/489 and the Metro Silver Line (Line 910). Line 258 was realigned to Highland Park in December 2020, due to low ridership, the city of San Marino on Oak Knoll Ave via Lake Ave (Pasadena) between Huntington Dr to California Bl. The portion on Lake Avenue is now served by Line 662 (Between Del Mar Blvd & Altadena Dr) as of June 2021.

486 - Downtown L.A. - El Monte - Amar Road - Puente Hills Mall Express
Line 486 was transferred to Foothill Transit and the Express route to Los Angeles was replaced by the Silver Streak.

488 - Downtown L.A. - El Monte - West Covina - Glendora Express
Line 488 was transferred to Foothill Transit and the Express route to Los Angeles was replaced by the Silver Streak express line.

490-499: via El Monte Busway (Services near San Bernardino County)

490 - Downtown L.A. - Covina - Diamond Bar - Brea Mall - Cal State Fullerton Express
Line 490 traveled from Downtown Los Angeles to Cal State Fullerton via Interstate 10 and SR 57 freeways. Line 490 was shortened to Cal Poly Pomona and renumbered Line 190 (later transferred to Foothill Transit), with the Metro Silver Line replacing the express service. The segment between Pomona and Brea Mall is now served by Foothill Transit Line 286. Service between Brea Mall and Cal State Fullerton is provided by OCTA Routes 57 and 153

491 - Downtown L.A. - El Monte - Sierra Madre Express
Line 491 provided service from Downtown Los Angeles to Sierra Madre via El Monte Busway. It operated as an express from Westlake/MacArthur Park Station through Downtown Los Angeles and El Monte Busway until El Monte Station. From the El Monte Station the route operated as a local route making all stops along Santa Anita Avenue.   The route number was retired as a result of the opening of the Metro Gold Line and interlined with Line 487, this practice was done during the weekend service for a number of years.  In 2006, the 487 split into two routes, Line 487 still running from Sierra Madre to Downtown while Line 287 operated the local Santa Anita Avenue service.  In 2012, lines 287 and 487 were merged (later 287 was replaced by the extension of line 487 and 176).

492 - Downtown L.A. - El Monte - South Arcadia - San Dimas Express
Line 492 was transferred to Foothill Transit in December 1988 by the former LACTC (Los Angeles County Transportation Commission, now part of Metro) when the former SCRTD (Southern California Rapid Transit District, predecessor of Metro) announced cuts that would adversely impact services in San Gabriel Valley.

493 - Downtown L.A. - El Monte -  Monrovia Express
Line 493 was discontinued between Downtown L.A. and El Monte, with the remainder of the Line transferred to Line 270 (later transferred to Foothill Transit). Now Line 493 has services in Industry Park n Ride, Puente hills Mall to Downtown Los Angeles.

494 - Downtown L.A. - El Monte - Monrovia - Glendora Express
Line 494 was transferred to Foothill Transit in December 1988 by the former LACTC (Los Angeles County Transportation Commission, now part of Metro) when the former SCRTD (Southern California Rapid Transit Authority, predecessor of Metro) announced cuts that would adversely impact services in San Gabriel Valley. Line 494 was then cancelled in December 2017, the route was replaced by Foothill Transit lines 270, 187 and 492 (all three lines were formerly operated by Metro).

495 - Downtown L.A. - Rowland Heights - Diamond Bar - Park-n-Ride Express
Line 495 was transferred to Foothill Transit in December 1988 by the former LACTC (Los Angeles County Transportation Commission, now part of Metro) when the former SCRTD (Southern California Rapid Transit Authority, predecessor of Metro) announced cuts that would adversely impact services in San Gabriel Valley. Line 495 was one of the first lines operated by Foothill Transit. The service is now provided by Foothill Transit Line 493.

496 - Downtown L.A. - Pomona - Riverside - San Bernardino Express
Line 496 was replaced by the Metrolink San Bernardino Line. The Country Village to Downtown Riverside portion of the line is now served by RTA (Riverside Transit Agency) Line 49.

497 - Downtown L.A. - Pomona - Montclair - Park-n-Ride Express
Line 497 was canceled on June 11, 2001. Service is now provided by Foothill Transit Line 699 and Silver Streak.

498 - Downtown L.A. - Eastland - Glendora - Park-n-Ride Express
Line 498 was transferred to Foothill Transit in December 1988 by the former LACTC (Los Angeles County Transportation Commission, now part of Metro) when the former SCRTD (Southern California Rapid Transit Authority, predecessor of Metro) announced cuts that would adversely impact services in San Gabriel Valley.

500s: Serving areas other than Downtown

522 - Reseda Boulevard - Ventura Boulevard - Downtown L.A. Express
Line 522 was renumbered Line 240 in June 2000 and realigned to terminate at Universal City Station, with the Metro Red Line replacing the express service. The line originally terminated at the US 101 Freeway bus stop at Vermont Avenue before it was extended into Downtown Los Angeles, which was initially assigned the 500-series line number and the only route to operate in Downtown Los Angeles.

534 - Malibu - Downtown Santa Monica - Washington/Fairfax Transit Hub via Pacific Coast Hwy & I-10 Fwy
Line 534 replaced the western remainder of Line 434 on December 2005 between Washington/Fairfax Transit Hub Transit Center and Malibu. Until the opening of the Expo Line (now known as the E Line) extension to Santa Monica, the eastern terminus of the route was relocated to the new Expo Line Downtown Santa Monica station leaving service on I-10 Fwy to be canceled. 6 years later, Line 534 was renumbered to Local Line 134 on October 23, 2022, as part of Phase 4.5 of the NextGen Plan as the route now runs more like a local route. The route and stops remain the same in the new Line 134.

560/561 - Van Nuys Boulevard - Westwood - Metro Green Line Aviation/I-105 Station Express 
Line 560 traveled between Lakeview Terrace and LAX (LA International Airport) Bus Terminal before it was split into Line 233 and Line 561. Line 561 operated as a limited-stop version of Line 233 on Van Nuys Boulevard then on the Interstate 405 freeway between Sherman Oaks and Getty Center and between Westwood and Culver City. Line 561 was replaced with Metro Rapid Line 761 (later 734, now reverted to 761) on Van Nuys Boulevard on June 29, 2003 and discontinued south of Westwood. The portion south of Westwood was replaced by Culver City Transit Line 6.

576 - South Los Angeles (Vernon) - Pacific Palisades Express
Line 576 was canceled in December 2004. Service is now provided by Metro Express Line 534 and Metro Local Line 105. Known as the "Nanny Express", Line 576 began shortly after the Watts riots to help with access to jobs, ferrying cooks, butlers and other household staff from the neighborhoods in South Los Angeles to employers in Beverly Hills, Westwood, Pacific Palisades and Malibu.

See also
 List of former Metro Local routes

References

Los Angeles County Metropolitan Transportation Authority